The 1946 Aleutian Islands earthquake occurred near the Aleutian Islands, Alaska on April 1, 1946. The shock had a moment magnitude of 8.6, a tsunami magnitude  of 9.3, and a surface-wave magnitude of only 7.4, and a maximum Mercalli intensity of VI (Strong). It resulted in 165–173 casualties and over $26 million in damage. The tsunami obliterated the Scotch Cap Lighthouse on Unimak Island, Alaska among others, and killed all five lighthouse keepers. Despite the destruction to the Aleutian Island Unimak, the tsunami had almost an imperceptible effect on the Alaskan mainland.

Tectonic setting

The Aleutian Islands are a group of 14 large and 55 smaller volcanic islands situated between mainland Alaska and Kamchatka. They are situated along the Aleutian Trench as they were formed by the active subduction of the oceanic Pacific plate underneath the continental crust of the North American plate. The western portion of the trench becomes more and more oblique until near the Commander Islands where faulting becomes nearly exclusively strike-slip and causes earthquakes such as the 2017 Komandorski Islands earthquake. The trench ends where the Kuril-Kamchatka Trench begins in the west. In the east, the trench extends for a couple thousand miles before reaching the transition zone near Yakataga responsible for creating earthquakes such as the 1899 Yakutat Bay earthquakes. The collision totally ends slightly further east, where the Queen Charlotte Fault becomes the dominant fault of the tectonic regime. This specific area of the Aleutian Islands is thought to have ruptured in the 1585 Aleutian Islands earthquake.

Earthquake
The earthquake was very large, but the maximum felt intensity was only a VI. The earthquake was originally thought to be a rather smaller earthquake of  7.4, however further research uncovered that this was truly a much larger event, but with a hidden seismic signature. This event shows the classic signs of a tsunami earthquake as the surface-wave magnitude was very low compared to the moment and tsunami magnitudes, and the tsunami height was far larger than expected for the surface wave magnitude. The very high tsunami magnitude value is due to the sheer strength of the waves. It was calculated by using tsunami run up from Honolulu, Hilo, and the average of stations in California. Even excluding the values given by Hilo (the highest ), the tsunami magnitude is at least 9.1. The earthquake was originally thought to be a strike-slip earthquake, and later a strike slip earthquake with a normal faulting component. These erroneous focal mechanisms were due to a lack of stations recording the earthquake. However, modeling of the S wave, rather than the P wave helped to uncover both the true magnitude of the earthquake, as well as the widely accepted thrusting mechanism. This thrust mechanism is consistent with a subduction earthquake helping to relieve stress on the Aleutian Trench.

Tsunami
At Unimak Island, tsunami run-up reached . The tsunami earthquake aspect of this event helps to explain a portion of this massive height, however the rest must be attributed to a local submarine landslide. The wave reached Kauai, Hawaii 4.5 hours after the quake, and Hilo, Hawaii 4.9 hours later. In Hilo, 173 died, 163 were injured, 488 buildings were demolished and 936 more were damaged. Witnesses told of waves inundating streets, homes, and storefronts. Many victims were swept out to sea by receding water. The tsunami caused much damage in Maui as well. Waves there demolished 77 homes and many other buildings. The residents of these islands were caught off-guard by the onset of the tsunami due to the inability to transmit warnings from the destroyed posts at Scotch Cap, and the tsunami is known as the April Fools' Day Tsunami in Hawaii because it happened on April 1. The effects of the tsunami also reached Washington, Oregon, and California.

The tsunami was unusually powerful for the size of the earthquake. The event was classified as a tsunami earthquake due to the discrepancy between the size of the tsunami and the relatively low surface-wave magnitude. The large-scale destruction prompted the creation of the Seismic Sea Wave Warning System, which became the Pacific Tsunami Warning Center in 1949.

See also

 List of earthquakes in 1946
 List of earthquakes in Alaska
 List of earthquakes in the United States

References

External links
 
 Tsunami Animation: Unimak Island, Aleutian Islands, 1946 – Pacific Tsunami Warning Center
 1946 Aleutians Tsunami – Western States Seismic Policy Council
 Mystery of Deadly 1946 Tsunami Deepens – LiveScience
 
 Survivor audio interview transcript

1946 earthquakes
1946 in Alaska
1946 in Hawaii
1946 tsunamis
Earthquake
Megathrust earthquakes in Alaska
1946 Aleutian
April 1946 events in the United States
Tsunami earthquakes
History of Hawaii